Blue flax is a common name of several species in the genus Linum (flax):

Linum lewisii, native to western North America
Linum narbonense, native to Europe
Linum perenne, native to Europe